EAServer is an application server developed by the company Sybase. It includes an integrated set of tools used to create and run web applications with support for high levels of traffic, dynamic content and intensive processing of online transactions.

EAServer provides the necessary infrastructure to run applications distributed based on components, residing in the middle layer of a multi-layer architecture, between the application client and the remote database.

EAServer allows the efficient management of client sessions, security, threads, connections to the database and flow of transactions, without requiring specialized knowledge on the part of the developer.

The most recent versions of EAServer are 5.5 and 6.1 (last revised 12/12/2007).

Main features 
EAServer includes the following features:
 A scalable execution engine, multi-threading, and independent of the platform
 Support for stubs and proxies for major component models, including JavaBeans, PowerBuilder, Java, ActiveX , and C / C ++
 Dynamic HTML support using Java Servlets and JavaServer Pages (JSP)
 Support for the platform development Java 2 Enterprise Edition (J2EE)
 Graphic administration through Sybase Central, which includes component management, security, transaction monitoring, etc.
 Close integration with the development environment of PowerBuilder
 Transparent management of client sessions and component life cycle
 Cache of connections to databases
 Standard name resolution services
 Transaction management that simplifies the design and implementation of an application transactions
 Simplified use of data and shared resources
 Support to result sets that allow the efficient recovery of tabular data in the applications client
 Declarative and role-based security that restricts client connections and components that can be invoked by a specific client session
 Support to asynchronous messaging and processing
 "Redirector Plugin" for web servers, which redirects the client's requirements directly to the web server
 Support for multiple network protocols, including IIOP, TDS (Tabular Data Stream from Sybase), HTTP and TLS

Supported platforms 
Among the operating systems supported by EAServer are:
 Linux
 HP-UX
 Sun Solaris
 IBM AIX
 Microsoft Windows

See also 
 Sybase
 Application server

External links 
Spanish
 More information on EAServer at www.mtbase.com

English
 Sybase corporate site
 More information on EAServer at www.sybase.com
 Online Documentation for Sybase EAServer

Server software